Glenn Graham may refer to:

 Glenn Graham (fiddler) (born 1974), Cape Breton fiddler
 Glenn Graham, percussionist for the group Blind Melon
 Glen Graham (1904–1986), 1924 Olympic silver medalist in the pole vault